Rudi Jeklic (born 5 November 1965) is a German former speed skater. He competed in two events at the 1992 Winter Olympics.

References

External links
 

1965 births
Living people
German male speed skaters
Olympic speed skaters of Germany
Speed skaters at the 1992 Winter Olympics
People from Traunstein (district)
Sportspeople from Upper Bavaria